U.S. Route 29 (US 29) enters Washington, D.C., via the Francis Scott Key Bridge from Arlington, Virginia, and exits at Silver Spring, Maryland. It predominantly follows city surface streets, although the portion of the route from Key Bridge east to 26th Street NW is an elevated highway.  The elevated section of U.S. Route 29 in D.C. is better known as the Whitehurst Freeway. Called the city's most ridiculed bridge in 1989, there have been several attempts to have the Whitehurst Freeway torn down but cost and other considerations have stopped these proposals from being acted on.

Route description

From Virginia, US 29 enters the District of Columbia on the Key Bridge. It then bypasses Georgetown on the Whitehurst Freeway, an elevated highway over K Street NW and Water Street NW. After crossing the K Street Bridge, US 29 then travels along K Street NW through downtown Washington. From K Street, US 29 turns left at 11th Street NW, then right at Rhode Island Avenue NW. US 29 northbound turns left at 6th Street NW, then left again onto Florida Avenue NW before turning right onto Georgia Avenue NW. US 29 southbound traffic on Georgia Avenue continues straight at Florida Avenue, where Georgia Avenue becomes 7th Street NW, then turns right at Rhode Island Avenue NW. US 29 follows Georgia Avenue NW out of the District and into Maryland.

History

Various alignments of Route 29 used to exist, including segments along New Hampshire Avenue NW, Dupont Circle, 16th Street NW, and Alaska Avenue NW.

Prior to construction of the Whitehurst Freeway, the Georgetown waterfront experienced periods of prosperity and decline. The freeway was seen as a component of what would eventually be the "Inner Loop", a system of three concentric high-speed freeways. (By the 1950s, planners envisioned replacing the Whitehurst Freeway with a much more massive, eight-lane road.) Planning for a "sky-road" above K Street NW along the Georgetown waterfront was already long-planned by the time architectural drawings were released to the public in December 1941. Congress authorized construction of the freeway on January 24, 1942, and appropriated $2.2 million of federal funds for its construction on February 6. But with the outbreak of World War II and the diversion of steel for war material, construction of the freeway was indefinitely postponed in May 1942. Gas rationing during the war caused the number of automobiles on roads to drop precipitously, helping to make the freeway unnecessary. Planning for post-war construction did not cease during the war, however. In May 1943, the United States Commission of Fine Arts approved a plan for post-war construction in Washington, D.C., that gave a high priority to the K Street freeway in fiscal 1947 (which began in July 1946).

Construction of the $3.294 million freeway began on June 1, 1947. The structure was built by engineer Archibald Alexander. The Des Moines, Iowa, firm of Alexander & Repass successfully bid to construct the viaduct.  The cost of the freeway was split between the D.C. and federal governments, with cost overruns to be paid from D.C. reserves. Extra federal funds were procured in the fiscal 1949 budget to speed its construction. Construction of the freeway required the demolition of the Francis Scott Key home at 3516 M Street NW.  Although efforts to have the home dismantled rather than demolished were successful, President Harry S. Truman declined to expend federal funds to have the home rebuilt elsewhere, and the structure went into storage.

Herbert C. Whitehurst, director of the D.C. highway department, died on September 1, 1948. A week later, his successor, Gordon R. Young, suggested that the then-under construction freeway should be named for him, in honor of his leadership in constructing many highway and bridges, including the new Chain Bridge; the Dupont, Scott, and Thomas Circle underpasses; the Fourteenth Street Bridge; the Calvert Street Bridge; and the Klingle Street Bridge. The Commissioners of the District of Columbia approved naming the freeway after Whitehurst.

The Whitehurst Freeway opened on October 8, 1949. Whitehurst's granddaughter Maria cut the ceremonial ribbon during the opening ceremonies.

Proposed demolition of Whitehurst Freeway

Demolition of the Whitehurst Freeway was first proposed in 1970. A report commissioned by the National Capitol Planning Commission and the Georgetown Citizens' Association said the freeway blocked vistas, inhibited development of the waterfront, was poorly engineered, and caused traffic back-ups at both of its ends. The report urged the city to bury the freeway in an enclosed trench and sell the air rights above it to developers or use it as parkland. But in 1977, D.C. director of municipal planning Ben Gilbert claimed that Whitehurst's "removal is not practical in the near future and maybe never".

In 1985, D.C. Mayor Marion Barry said he wanted to retain the Whitehurst Freeway.

City public works officials implemented a $47 million rehabilitation of the Whitehurst Freeway in 1989. Officials also sandblasted rust and old paint from the understructure, and repainted it. A westbound ramp used to access Key Bridge was also eliminated, and replaced with a new traffic route that required motorists to go to Canal Road NW/M Street NW, wait for the traffic light, and turn east to access Key Bridge. Two unused ramps at the eastern end of Whitehurst Freeway were also demolished. (The ramps were built to connect the freeway to the proposed Inner Loop, but that project was never constructed.) Prior to the rehabilitation, city officials studied the feasibility and cost of either burying the freeway in a tunnel, or widening K Street NW into a much larger boulevard. Cost considerations (one cost estimate for the tunnel was $400 million) and the inability to connect the tunnel or boulevard to Key Bridge far above it ruled out both options. Construction on the renovation began in December 1990.

In 1991, with refurbishment of the Whitehurst Freeway about 40 percent complete, Georgetown residents asked the new mayor, Sharon Pratt Dixon, to reverse the Barry administration's decision and tear down the Whitehurst Freeway. Dixon declined to do so.

The Government of the District of Columbia proposed demolishing the Whitehurst Freeway and widening K Street to a 4- or 6-lane street. Another engineering difficulty is how to connect K Street NW to the Key Bridge. Architect Arthur Cotton Moore has proposed replacing the off-ramp from northbound Key Bridge to eastbound Whitehurst Freeway with a spiral ramp that would loop under and descend beneath Key Bridge before connecting to eastbound K Street NW.

In 2007, D.C. Mayor Adrian Fenty halted plans for an environmental impact study for the proposed demolition, stating that his administration is "not going to be spending money on this particular issue. You do not have to worry." The study would have cost nearly $1 million. The District of Columbia Department of Transportation spent more than $500,000 on a previous study that examined proposed alternatives to the highway.

Proposed route
In 1960, the D.C. Highway and Traffic Department proposed construction of a new Potomac River Freeway. The Whitehurst Freeway and portion of U.S. Route 29 carried by it would be redesignated as the Potomac River Freeway. The new parkway would be built on top of Canal Road NW and extend to the Georgetown Reservoir, where it would connect to the George Washington Memorial Parkway (called the Clara Barton Parkway after 1989). A proposed spur of the Potomac River Freeway, designated Interstate 266, would begin at the junction of the Potomac River Freeway and Foxhall Road NW, and be carried over a proposed Three Sisters Bridge to Virginia. There it would connect (via an as-yet undefined route) with Interstate 66.

Major intersections
The entire route is in Washington, D.C.

Notes

References

External links

District of Columbia Department of Transportation. Whitehurst Freeway Deconstruction Feasibility Study. October 2005.

29
 District of Columbia
Georgetown (Washington, D.C.)